The 2012 United States House of Representatives elections in Oregon were held on Tuesday, November 6, 2012 to elect the five U.S. representatives from the state of Oregon, apportioned according to the 2010 United States Census. The elections coincided with the elections of other federal and state offices, including a quadrennial presidential election.  All five incumbents, four Democrats and one Republican, were re-elected to another term.

Primary elections for Democrats and Republicans were held on May 15, 2012; other parties had other nominating procedures. Several candidates received nominations for multiple parties, as permitted by Oregon law.

Overview

Redistricting
On June 29, 2011, members of the Oregon Legislative Assembly reached an agreement on redistricting all five of Oregon's congressional districts, as required by population changes from the 2010 Census. Among other changes, Downtown Portland was moved from District 1 to District 3; District 2 ceded more of the Grants Pass area to District 4; and District 5 was changed to include more of Clackamas County and only small parts of Multnomah County.

District 1

Oregon's 1st congressional district is represented by Democrat Suzanne Bonamici, the winner of a January 2012 special election held after Representative David Wu resigned following allegations of an unwanted sexual encounter following the resolution of the 2011 U.S. debt ceiling crisis. The district has a PVI of D+6.

Democratic primary

Candidates

Nominee
 Suzanne Bonamici, incumbent U.S. Representative

Declined
Brad Avakian, state Commissioner of Labor and Industries and candidate for this seat in 2012 (special)
Ryan Deckert, former state senator
Elizabeth Furse, former U.S. Representative 
Greg Macpherson, former state representative
Dan Saltzman, Portland city commissioner
Brad Witt, state representative and candidate for this seat in 2012 (special)

Primary results

Republican primary

Candidates

Nominee
Delinda Morgan, vineyard owner

Eliminated in primary
Lisa Michaels, activist, cable host and candidate for this seat in 2012 (special)

Declined
Rob Cornilles, sports marketing consultant and nominee for this seat in 2010 & 2012 (special)
Rob Miller, businessman
Bruce Starr state senator

Results

General election

Results

District 2

Republican Greg Walden has represented Oregon's 2nd congressional district since 1998 and is seeking re-election. The district has a PVI of R+10.

Republican primary

Candidates

Nominee
Greg Walden, incumbent U.S. Representative

Primary results

Democratic primary

Candidates

Nominee
Joyce Segers, businesswoman, writer and nominee for this seat in 2010

Eliminated in primary
John Sweeney, activist

Results

General election

Results

District 3

Democrat Earl Blumenauer has represented Oregon's 3rd congressional district since 1996 and is seeking re-election. The district is the most Democratic-leaning district in the state, with a PVI of D+21.

Democratic primary

Candidates

Nominee
 Earl Blumenauer, incumbent U.S. Representative

Primary results

Republican primary

Candidates

Nominee
Ronald Green, bus operator

Eliminated in primary
Delia Lopez, real estate investor

Results

General election

Results

District 4

Oregon's 4th congressional district has been represented by Democrat Peter DeFazio since 1987 and he is seeking re-election. The district has a PVI of D+2.

Democratic primary

Candidates

Nominee
 Peter DeFazio, incumbent U.S. Representative

Eliminated in primary
 Matthew Robinson, nuclear engineering graduate student and son of Arthur B. Robinson

Results

Republican primary

Candidates

Nominee
Arthur B. Robinson, chemist and nominee for this seat in 2010

Results

General election

Endorsements

Results

District 5

Democratic incumbent Kurt Schrader has represented Oregon's 5th congressional district since 2008 and is running for re-election in what is often considered to be the most competitive district in the state. In fact, the district has an even PVI.

Democratic primary

Candidates

Nominee
 Kurt Schrader, incumbent U.S. Representative

Primary results

Republican primary

Candidates

Nominee
Fred Thompson, retired timber executive and candidate for this seat in 2010

Eliminated in primary
Karen Bowerman, business consultant and retired college administrator

Declined
Scott Bruun, former state representative and nominee for this seat in 2010
Chris Dudley, former professional basketball player and nominee for Governor in 2010

Results

General election

Endorsements

Predictions

Results

See also
 Oregon's 1st congressional district special election, 2012
 United States House of Representatives elections, 2012
 United States presidential election in Oregon, 2012
 Oregon state elections, 2012

References

External links
Elections Division at the Oregon Secretary of State
United States House of Representatives elections in Oregon, 2012 at Ballotpedia
Oregon U.S. House from OurCampaigns.com
Campaign contributions for U.S. Congressional races in Oregon from OpenSecrets
Outside spending at the Sunlight Foundation

2012
Oregon
House